Walby is a surname. It derives from Walby in Cumbria, England, or Waulby near Kingston upon Hull.

Notable people with the surname include:

Chris Walby (born 1956), Canadian football player and sportscaster
Kate Walby, English television journalist
Steffon Walby (born 1972), American ice hockey player and coach
Sylvia Walby, British sociologist
Tony Walby (born 1973), Canadian judoka
Michael Walby (born 1976), Corporate lawyer, Solicitor of the Supreme Court

References